"On & Off" is a song recorded by Finnish singer Krista Siegfrids. The song was released as a digital download in Finland on 20 February 2015. The song peaked at number 8 on the Finnish Download and Airplay Chart.

Music video
A music video to accompany the release of "On & Off" was first released onto YouTube on 20 February 2015 at a total length of three minutes and two seconds.

Track listing

Chart performance

Release history

References

2015 singles
2015 songs
Krista Siegfrids songs
Songs written by Patric Sarin
Songs written by Joonas Angeria